Paulo Victor Costa Soares (born 13 September 1994) is a Brazilian professional footballer who plays as a forward for Liga 1 club Persebaya Surabaya.

Club career
Paulo Victor began playing football América Futebol Clube (RN)'s youth system. He played professionally with Goyang Zaicro in Korea during 2016, before joining Nacional Atlético Clube (MG) in January 2018.

In 2019, Soares signed for Phnom Penh Crown in the C-League, and made his debut against Boeung Ket Angkor in the first game of the season when he scored his first goal for the club despite his team going down 3:2.

References

External links
 

Living people
1994 births
Brazilian footballers
Association football defenders
Goyang Zaicro FC players
Expatriate footballers in Cambodia
Phnom Penh Crown FC players
Expatriate footballers in Bahrain
Brazilian expatriate footballers
Brazilian expatriate sportspeople in South Korea
Brazilian expatriate sportspeople in Cambodia
Brazilian expatriate sportspeople in Indonesia
Expatriate footballers in South Korea
Expatriate footballers in Indonesia
People from São Luís, Maranhão
Sportspeople from Maranhão
Visakha FC players
Cambodian Premier League players
Persebaya Surabaya players
Liga 1 (Indonesia) players